The 2011–12 LNAH season was the 16th season of the Ligue Nord-Américaine de Hockey (before 2004 the Quebec Semi-Pro Hockey League), a minor professional league in the Canadian province of Quebec. Seven teams participated in the regular season, which was won by the Marquis de Saguenay. Isothermic de Thetford Mines won the playoff championship.

Regular season

Coupe Canam-Playoffs

External links 
 LNAH Official Website

Ligue Nord-Américaine de Hockey seasons
3